Ingrid Larsen (1 July 1909 – 25 February 1990) was a Danish chess player who holds the title of Woman International Master (WIM, 1950). She was a seventeen-times winner the Danish Women's Chess Championship.

Biography
From the late 1930s to the early 1980s, Ingrid Larsen was one of the leading chess players in the Denmark. Seventeen times she won the Danish Women's Chess Championships: 1936, 1937, 1938, 1939, 1943, 1944, 1945, 1946, 1948, 1949, 1953, 1956, 1957, 1960, 1965, 1969 and 1983.

Ingrid Larsen three times participated in the Women's World Chess Championship Tournaments:
 In 1937, at Women's World Chess Championship in Stockholm shared 21st-22nd place;
 In 1939, at Women's World Chess Championship in Buenos Aires has taken 11th place;
 In 1950, at Women's World Chess Championship in Moscow has taken 15th place.

Ingrid Larsen played for Denmark in the Women's Chess Olympiads:
 In 1957, at first board in the 1st Chess Olympiad (women) in Emmen (+5, =2, -4),
 In 1966, at first board in the 3rd Chess Olympiad (women) in Oberhausen (+1, =5, -7),
 In 1969, at second board in the 4th Chess Olympiad (women) in Lublin (+0, =5, -6),
 In 1976, at third board in the 7th Chess Olympiad (women) in Haifa (+4, =4, -4),
 In 1978, at third board in the 8th Chess Olympiad (women) in Buenos Aires (+6, =3, -5),
 In 1980, at first reserve board in the 9th Chess Olympiad (women) in Valletta (+1, =3, -6).

In 1950, she was awarded the FIDE Woman International Master (WIM) title.

References

External links
 
 

1909 births
1990 deaths
Danish female chess players
Chess Woman International Masters
Chess Olympiad competitors
20th-century chess players